Daouda Malam Wanké (May 6, 1946 – September 15, 2004) was a military and political leader in Niger. He was a member of Hausa ethnic group.

Wanké's year of birth is disputed. Many sources claim it is 1954 while others 1946.

Biography

He was born in Yellou, a town near Niger's capital, Niamey. He entered the Niger military, rising to the rank of Major. On April 9, 1999, Wanké led a military coup in which President Ibrahim Baré Maïnassara, who himself had come to power in a military coup, was assassinated. For two days there was much political uncertainty in Niger, as the prime minister, Ibrahim Hassane Mayaki and several others also had claims on the presidency. On April 11, 1999, Wanké became president, heading a transitional government that promised to hold elections later that year.

Wanké's government fulfilled its promise, and turned over power to the newly elected president, Mamadou Tandja, in December 1999. Wanké subsequently suffered from various health problems, including cardiovascular troubles and high blood pressure. During the last months of his life, he traveled to Libya, Morocco and Switzerland for medical treatment. He died in Niamey. He is survived by a wife and three children.

References

Presidents of Niger
Nigerien military personnel
Leaders who took power by coup
2004 deaths
People from Niamey
Hausa people
1946 births
Age controversies